

Events

Pre-1600
28 BC – A sunspot is observed by Han dynasty astronomers during the reign of Emperor Cheng of Han, one of the earliest dated sunspot observations in China.
1291 – Scottish nobles recognize the authority of Edward I of England pending the selection of a king.
1294 – Temür, Khagan of the Mongols, is enthroned as Emperor of the Yuan dynasty.
1497 – Amerigo Vespucci allegedly leaves Cádiz for his first voyage to the New World.
1503 – Christopher Columbus visits the Cayman Islands and names them Las Tortugas after the numerous turtles there.
1534 – Jacques Cartier visits Newfoundland.

1601–1900
1688 – King Narai nominates Phetracha as regent, leading to the revolution of 1688 in which Phetracha becomes king of the Ayutthaya Kingdom.
1768 – Rioting occurs in London after John Wilkes is imprisoned for writing an article for The North Briton severely criticizing King George III.
1773 – The Parliament of Great Britain passes the Tea Act, designed to save the British East India Company by reducing taxes on its tea and granting it the right to sell tea directly to North America. The legislation leads to the Boston Tea Party.
1774 – Louis XVI and Marie Antoinette become King and Queen of France.
1775 – American Revolutionary War: A small Colonial militia led by Ethan Allen and Colonel Benedict Arnold captures Fort Ticonderoga.
  1775   – American Revolutionary War: The Second Continental Congress takes place in Philadelphia.
1796 – War of the First Coalition: Napoleon wins a victory against Austrian forces at Lodi bridge over the Adda River in Italy. The Austrians lose some 2,000 men.
1801 – First Barbary War: The Barbary pirates of Tripoli declare war on the United States of America.
1824 – The National Gallery in London opens to the public.
1833 – A revolt broke out in southern Vietnam against Emperor Minh Mang, who had desecrated the deceased mandarin Le Van Duyet.
1837 – Panic of 1837: New York City banks suspend the payment of specie, triggering a national banking crisis and an economic depression whose severity was not surpassed until the Great Depression.
1849 – Astor Place Riot: A riot breaks out at the Astor Opera House in Manhattan, New York City over a dispute between actors Edwin Forrest and William Charles Macready, killing at least 22 and injuring over 120.
1857 – Indian Rebellion of 1857: In India, the first war of Independence begins. Sepoys mutiny against their commanding officers at Meerut.
1865 – American Civil War: In Kentucky, Union soldiers ambush and mortally wound Confederate raider William Quantrill, who lingers until his death on June 6.
1869 – The First transcontinental railroad, linking the eastern and western United States, is completed at Promontory Summit, Utah Territory with the golden spike.
1872 – Victoria Woodhull becomes the first woman nominated for President of the United States.
1876 – The Centennial Exposition is opened in Philadelphia.
1881 – Carol I is crowned the King of the Romanian Kingdom.
1899 – Finnish farmworker Karl Emil Malmelin kills seven people with an axe at the Simola croft in the village of Klaukkala.

1901–present
1904 – The Horch & Cir. Motorwagenwerke AG is founded. It would eventually become the Audi company.
1908 – Mother's Day is observed for the first time in the United States, in Grafton, West Virginia.
1916 – Sailing in the lifeboat James Caird, Ernest Shackleton arrives at South Georgia after a journey of 800 nautical miles from Elephant Island.
1922 – The United States annexes the Kingman Reef.
1924 – J. Edgar Hoover is appointed first Director of the United States' Federal Bureau of Investigation (FBI), and remains so until his death in 1972.
1933 – Censorship: In Germany, the Nazis stage massive public book burnings.
1940 – World War II: German fighters accidentally bomb the German city of Freiburg.
  1940   – World War II: Winston Churchill is appointed Prime Minister of the United Kingdom following the resignation of Neville Chamberlain. On the same day, Germany invades France, The Netherlands, Belgium and Luxembourg. Meanwhile, the United Kingdom occupies Iceland.
1941 – World War II: The House of Commons in London is damaged by the Luftwaffe in an air raid.
  1941   – World War II: Rudolf Hess parachutes into Scotland to try to negotiate a peace deal between the United Kingdom and Nazi Germany.
1942 – World War II: The Thai Phayap Army invades the Shan States during the Burma Campaign.
1946 – First successful launch of an American V-2 rocket at White Sands Proving Ground.
1961 – Air France Flight 406 is destroyed by a bomb over the Sahara, killing 78.
1962 – Marvel Comics publishes the first issue of The Incredible Hulk.
1967 – The Northrop M2-F2 crashes on landing, becoming the inspiration for the novel Cyborg and TV series The Six Million Dollar Man.
1969 – Vietnam War: The Battle of Dong Ap Bia begins with an assault on Hill 937. It will ultimately become known as Hamburger Hill.
1975 – Sony introduces the Betamax videocassette recorder.
1993 – In Thailand, a fire at the Kader Toy Factory kills over 200 workers.
1994 – Nelson Mandela is inaugurated as South Africa's first black president.
1996 – A blizzard strikes Mount Everest, killing eight climbers by the next day.
1997 – The 7.3 Mw Qayen earthquake strikes Iran's Khorasan Province killing 1,567 people.
2002 – FBI agent Robert Hanssen is sentenced to life imprisonment without the possibility of parole for selling United States secrets to Russia for $1.4 million in cash and diamonds.
2012 – The Damascus bombings are carried out using a pair of car bombs detonated by suicide bombers outside a military intelligence complex in Damascus, Syria, killing 55 people.
2013 – One World Trade Center becomes the tallest building in the Western Hemisphere.
2017 – Syrian civil war: The Syrian Democratic Forces (SDF) capture the last footholds of the Islamic State of Iraq and the Levant (ISIL) in Al-Tabqah, bringing the Battle of Tabqa to an end.
2022 – Queen Elizabeth II misses the State Opening of Parliament for the first time in 59 years. It was the first time that a new session of Parliament was opened jointly by the Prince of Wales and the Duke of Cambridge acting as Counsellors of State.

Births

Pre-1600

 874 – Meng Zhixiang, Chinese general and emperor (d. 934)
 955 – Al-Aziz Billah, Fatimid caliph (d. 996)
1491 – Suzanne, Duchess of Bourbon (d. 1521)

1601–1900
1604 – Jean Mairet, French author and playwright (d. 1686)
1697 – Jean-Marie Leclair, French violinist and composer (d. 1764)
1727 – Anne-Robert-Jacques Turgot, Baron de Laune, French economist and politician (d. 1781)
1755 – Robert Gray, American captain and explorer (d. 1806)
1760 – Johann Peter Hebel, German author and poet (d. 1826)
  1760   – Claude Joseph Rouget de Lisle, French captain, engineer, and composer (d. 1836)
1770 – Louis-Nicolas Davout, French general and politician, French Minister of War (d. 1823)
1788 – Augustin-Jean Fresnel, French physicist and engineer (d. 1827)
1812 – William Henry Barlow, English engineer (d. 1902)
1813 – Montgomery Blair, American lieutenant and politician, 20th United States Postmaster General (d. 1883)
1838 – John Wilkes Booth, American actor, assassin of Abraham Lincoln (d. 1865)
1841 – James Gordon Bennett, Jr., American publisher and broadcaster (d. 1918)
1843 – Benito Pérez Galdós, Spanish author and playwright (d. 1920)
1847 – Wilhelm Killing, German mathematician and academic (d. 1923)
1855 – Yukteswar Giri, Indian guru and educator (d. 1936)
1872 – Marcel Mauss, French sociologist and anthropologist (d. 1950)
1876 – Ivan Cankar, Slovenian poet and playwright (d. 1918)
1878 – Konstantinos Parthenis, Greek painter (d. 1967)
  1878   – Gustav Stresemann, German journalist and politician, Chancellor of Germany, Nobel Prize laureate (d. 1929)
1879 – Symon Petliura, Ukrainian journalist and politician (d. 1926)
1886 – Karl Barth, Swiss theologian and author (d. 1968)
1888 – Max Steiner, Austrian-American composer and conductor (d. 1971)
1890 – Alfred Jodl, German general (d. 1946)
1891 – Mahmoud Mokhtar, Egyptian sculptor and academic (d. 1934)
1893 – Tonita Peña, San Ildefonso Pueblo (Native American) artist (d. 1949)
1894 – Dimitri Tiomkin, Ukrainian-American composer and conductor (d. 1979)
1895 – Joe Murphy (Irish republican) Irish Hunger Striker (d. 1920)
1897 – Einar Gerhardsen, Norwegian politician, Prime Minister of Norway (d. 1987)
1898 – Ariel Durant, American historian and author (d. 1981)
1899 – Fred Astaire, American actor, singer, and dancer (d. 1987)
1900 – Cecilia Payne-Gaposchkin, English-American astronomer and astrophysicist (d. 1979)

1901–present
1901 – John Desmond Bernal, Irish-English crystallographer and physicist (d. 1971)
  1901   – Hildrus Poindexter, American bacteriologist (d. 1987)
1902 – David O. Selznick, American director and producer (d. 1965)
1903 – Otto Bradfisch, German economist, jurist, and SS officer (d. 1994)
1905 – Markos Vamvakaris, Greek singer-songwriter and bouzouki player (d. 1972)
1908 – Carl Albert, American lawyer and politician, 54th Speaker of the United States House of Representatives (d. 2000)
1909 – Maybelle Carter, American autoharp player (d. 1978)
1911 – Bel Kaufman, American author and educator (d. 2014)
1915 – Denis Thatcher, English soldier and businessman, Spouse of the Prime Minister of the United Kingdom (d. 2003)
1916 – Milton Babbitt, American composer and educator (d. 2011)
1918 – T. Berry Brazelton, American pediatrician and author (d. 2018)
  1918   – Desmond MacNamara, Irish painter, sculptor, and author (d. 2008)
1919 – Ella T. Grasso, Governor of Connecticut (d. 1981)
1920 – Basil Kelly, Northern Irish barrister, judge and politician (d. 2008)
  1920   – Bert Weedon, English guitarist (d. 2012)
1922 – David Azrieli, Polish-Canadian businessman and philanthropist (d. 2014)
  1922   – Nancy Walker, American actress, singer, and director (d. 1992)
1923 – Heydar Aliyev, Azerbaijan general and politician, President of Azerbaijan (d. 2003)
  1923   – Otar Korkia, Georgian basketball player and coach (d. 2005)
1926 – Hugo Banzer, Bolivian general and politician, President of Bolivia (d. 2002)
1927 – Nayantara Sahgal, Indian author
1928 – Arnold Rüütel, Estonian agronomist and politician, President of Estonia
  1928   – Lothar Schmid, German chess player (d. 2013)
1929 – Audun Boysen, Norwegian runner (d. 2000)
  1929   – George Coe, American actor and producer (d. 2015)
  1929   – Antonine Maillet, Canadian author and playwright
1930 – George E. Smith, American physicist and engineer, Nobel Prize laureate
1931 – Ettore Scola, Italian director and screenwriter (d. 2016)
1933 – Jean Becker, French actor, director, and screenwriter
1935 – Larry Williams, American singer-songwriter, pianist, and producer (d. 1980)
1937 – Tamara Press, Ukrainian shot putter and discus thrower (d. 2021)
1938 – Manuel Santana, Spanish tennis player (d. 2021)
1940 – Arthur Alexander, American country-soul singer-songwriter (d. 1993)
  1940  – Sven-Gunnar Larsson, Swedish retired football player
  1940   – Wayne Dyer, American author and educator (d. 2015)
1942 – Jim Calhoun, American basketball player and coach
1944 – Jim Abrahams, American director, producer, and screenwriter
  1944   – Marie-France Pisier, French actress, director, and screenwriter (d. 2011)
1946 – Donovan, Scottish singer-songwriter
  1946   – Graham Gouldman, English guitarist and songwriter
  1946   – Dave Mason, English singer-songwriter and guitarist
1947 – Caroline B. Cooney, American author
1949 – Miuccia Prada, Italian fashion designer
1952 – Sly Dunbar, Jamaican drummer 
1954 – Mike Hagarty, American Actor 
1955 – Mark David Chapman, American murderer
1956 – Vladislav Listyev, Russian journalist (d. 1995)
1957 – Sid Vicious, English singer and bass player (d. 1979)
1958 – Gaétan Boucher, Canadian speed skater
  1958   – Rick Santorum, American lawyer and politician, United States Senator from Pennsylvania
1959 – Victoria Rowell, American actress
  1959   – Danny Schayes, American basketball player
  1959   – Cindy Hyde-Smith, American politician, United States Senator from Mississippi, Mississippi Commissioner of Agriculture and Commerce
1960 – Bono, Irish singer-songwriter, musician and activist
  1960   – Dean Heller, American lawyer and politician, United States Senator from Nevada, Secretary of State of Nevada
  1960   – Merlene Ottey, Jamaican-Slovenian runner
1963 – Lisa Nowak, American commander and astronaut
  1963   – Debbie Wiseman, English composer and conductor
1965 – Linda Evangelista, Canadian model
1966 – Jonathan Edwards, English triple jumper
1967 – Eion Crossan, New Zealand rugby player
1968 – Al Murray, English comedian and television host
  1968   – Tatyana Shikolenko, Russian javelin thrower
1969 – Dennis Bergkamp, Dutch footballer and manager
  1969   – John Scalzi, American author and blogger
1970 – Gabriela Montero, Venezuelan-American pianist
  1970   – David Weir, Scottish footballer
1971 – Ådne Søndrål, Norwegian speed skater
1972 – Christian Wörns, German footballer
1973 – Joshua Eagle, Australian tennis player
  1973   – Ollie le Roux, South African rugby player
1974 – Sylvain Wiltord, French footballer
1975 – Hélio Castroneves, Brazilian race car driver
  1975   – Adam Deadmarsh, Canadian-American ice hockey player
1978 – Bruno Cheyrou, French footballer
  1978  – Kenan Thompson, American actor and comedian
1981 – Samuel Dalembert, Haitian-Canadian basketball player
  1981   – Humberto Suazo, Chilean footballer
1983 – Gustav Fridolin, Swedish journalist and politician, Swedish Minister of Education
1984 – Edward Mujica, Venezuelan baseball player
1985 – Ryan Getzlaf, Canadian ice hockey player
  1985   – Jon Schofield, English canoe racer
1987 – Wilson Chandler, American basketball player
1990 – Salvador Pérez,  Venezuelan baseball player
  1990   – Ivana Španović, Serbian long jumper
1995 – Missy Franklin, American swimmer
  1995   – Gabriella Papadakis, French ice dancer
1996 – Tyus Jones, American basketball player
  1996   – Kateřina Siniaková, Czech tennis player
  1997 - Brittany Broski, American comedian and singer 
  1997 - Richarlison, Brazilian footballer 
1998 – Priscilla Hon, Australian tennis player

Deaths

Pre-1600
1299 – Theingapati, heir to the Pagan Kingdom
1403 – Katherine Swynford, widow of John of Gaunt
1482 – Paolo dal Pozzo Toscanelli, Italian mathematician and astronomer (b. 1397)
1493 – Colin Campbell, 1st Earl of Argyll, Scottish politician, Lord Chancellor of Scotland (b. 1433)
1521 – Sebastian Brant, German author (b. 1457)
1566 – Leonhart Fuchs, German physician and botanist (b. 1501)
1569 – John of Ávila, Spanish mystic and saint (b. 1500)

1601–1900
1641 – Johan Banér, Swedish field marshal (b. 1596)
1717 – John Hathorne, American merchant and politician (b. 1641)
1726 – Charles Beauclerk, 1st Duke of St Albans, English soldier and politician, Lord Lieutenant of Berkshire (b. 1670)
1774 – Louis XV of France (b. 1710)
1787 – William Watson, English physician, physicist, and botanist (b. 1715)
1794 – Élisabeth of France, French princess and youngest sibling of Louis XVI (b.1764)
1798 – George Vancouver, English navigator and explorer (b. 1757)
1807 – Jean-Baptiste Donatien de Vimeur, comte de Rochambeau, French general (b. 1725)
1818 – Paul Revere, American engraver and soldier (b. 1735)
1829 – Thomas Young, English physician and linguist (b. 1773)
1849 – Hokusai, Japanese painter and illustrator (b. 1760)
1863 – Stonewall Jackson, American general (b. 1824)
1865 – William Armstrong, American lawyer, civil servant, politician, and businessperson (b. 1782)
1868 – Henry Bennett, American lawyer and politician (b. 1808)
1889 – Mikhail Saltykov-Shchedrin, Russian journalist, author, and playwright (b. 1826)
1891 – Carl Nägeli, Swiss botanist and mycologist (b. 1817)
1897 – Andrés Bonifacio, Filipino soldier and politician, President of the Philippines (b. 1863)

1901–present
1910 – Stanislao Cannizzaro, Italian chemist and academic (b. 1826)
1945 – Richard Glücks, German SS officer (b. 1889)
  1945   – Konrad Henlein, Czech soldier and politician (b. 1898)
1950 – Belle da Costa Greene, American librarian and bibliographer (b. 1883)
1960 – Yury Olesha, Russian author, poet, and playwright (b. 1899)
1964 – Mikhail Larionov, Russian painter, illustrator, and set designer (b. 1881)
1965 – Hubertus van Mook, Dutch politician, Governor-General of the Dutch East Indies (b. 1894)
1968 – Scotty Beckett, American actor and singer (b. 1929)
1974 – Hal Mohr, American director and cinematographer (b. 1894)
1977 – Joan Crawford, American actress (year of birth disputed)
1982 – Peter Weiss, German playwright and painter (b. 1916)
1988 – Shen Congwen, Chinese author and academic (b. 1902)
1990 – Walker Percy, American novelist and essayist (b. 1916)
1994 – John Wayne Gacy, American serial killer (b. 1942)
1999 – Shel Silverstein, American poet, author, and illustrator (b.1930)
2000 – Jules Deschênes, Canadian lawyer and judge (b. 1923)
  2000   – Dick Sprang, American illustrator (b. 1915)
2001 – Sudhakarrao Naik, Indian politician, Governor of Himachal Pradesh (b. 1934)
2002 – Kaifi Azmi, Indian poet and songwriter (b. 1919)
  2002   – Yves Robert, French actor, director, producer, and screenwriter (b. 1920)
2003 – Milan Vukcevich, Serbian-American chemist and chess player (b. 1937)
2006 – Soraya, Colombian-American singer-songwriter, guitarist, and producer (b. 1969)
2008 – Leyla Gencer, Turkish soprano (b. 1928)
2010 – Frank Frazetta, American illustrator and painter (b. 1928)
2012 – Horst Faas, German photographer and journalist (b. 1933)
  2012   – Carroll Shelby, American race car driver and designer (b. 1923)
  2012   – Gunnar Sønsteby, Norwegian captain and author (b. 1918)
2015 – Chris Burden, American sculptor, illustrator, and academic (b. 1946)
2018 – David Goodall, Australian botanist and ecologist (b. 1914)
2019 – Alfredo Pérez Rubalcaba, Spanish politician and chemist (b. 1951)
2020 – Betty Wright, American soul singer (b. 1953)
2021 – Pauline Tinsley, British soprano (b. 1928)
2022 – Bob Lanier, American professional basketball player (b. 1948)
2022 – Leonid Kravchuk, Ukrainian politician (b.1934)

Holidays and observances
Children's Day (Maldives)
Christian feast day:
Alphius, Philadelphus and Cyrinus
Calepodius
Catald
Comgall
Damien of Molokai
Gordianus and Epimachus
Job (Roman Catholic Church, pre-1969 calendar)
John of Ávila
May 10 (Eastern Orthodox liturgics)
Confederate Memorial Day (North Carolina and South Carolina)
Constitution Day (Micronesia)
Earliest possible day on which Pentecost can fall, while June 13 is the latest; celebrated 50 days after Easter Day.(Christianity)
Golden Spike Day (Promontory, Utah)
Mother's Day (Guatemala, and Mexico)

References

External links

 BBC: On This Day
 
 Historical Events on May 10

Days of the year
May